Mavromatis or Mavrommatis is a Greek surname. Notable people with the surname include: 

Sotiris Mavromatis
Theofanis Mavromatis (born 1997), Greek footballer
Frangiskos Mavrommatis
Nikolaos Mavrommatis, Greek sport shooter
Dmitri Mavrommatis
Theofanus Mavromatis, known as Fan Noli

Greek-language surnames